Farid Khayrullovich Mukhametshin (also Farit Mokhametshin; ; ; born May 22, 1947, in Almetyevsk, USSR) is a Russian politician and a former Prime Minister of Tatarstan. He is an ethnic Tatar.

He was elected in March 1994 to the upper chamber of the Federal Assembly of Russia.

He was Chairman of the Supreme Council and State Council of Tatarstan Republic July 1991–January 1995. He is the current Chairman of the State Council of Tatarstan Republic since May 27, 1998.

Notes

Living people
1947 births
Volga Tatar people
Tatar people of Russia
Tatar politicians
Prime Ministers of Tatarstan
Politicians of Tatarstan
People from Almetyevsk
Members of the Federation Council of Russia (1996–2000)
Members of the Federation Council of Russia (after 2000)